Teudopsis is a genus of the coleoid cephalopod family Teudopsidae, known only from Lower Jurassic gladii. It has been reported from Alberta, Canada and Europe. The life appearance of Teudopsis is probably best inferred by its close relative Trachyteuthis. 
A fossil with soft tissue preservation shows that this animal may have had two mantle fins, which may also be the case for Teudopsis.

References

Coleoidea
Cephalopod genera
Fossil taxa described in 1835